Tully App (subsidiary of Vertical Craft Inc.) is a desktop and mobile application that provides a variety of tools for musicians and music business executives to use for career management. Tully was first developed as a songwriting app to enable artists to play, write and record within one screen. The app later expanded its services with both management and distribution tools. Tully launched in 2015 on iOS and Android and has an average of 50,000 monthly users.

History
In 2015, music executive, Dhruv Joshi founded technology company Vertical Craft Inc. with independent music artist, Joyner Lucas. The company was founded in San Francisco, California. Vertical Craft Inc. develops various technology tools catered to artists in the music industry.

Tully was the first platform released by Vertical Craft Inc. in late 2015. Tully shares a corporate office space with Sony Music in New York City. Tully has a strategic alliance with Symphonic Distribution.  This is a gated distribution service for artists that qualify.

Development and features
The Tully app is a business management platform for independent music artists. Its main features include music and file storage, royalty and publishing chart access, songwriting and recording tools, royalty-free beats, and overall workflow management. Through the app, users can also distribute their music to streaming platforms, like Spotify, Apple Music, and Tidal.

Since its launch, Tully offers in-app services and has expanded to include a web-based platform. 

Tully was created using iOS and Android Native programing language, Swift and Java.  As of 2021 Tully is now fully scaled and built on React Native.

Usage
Tully has 50,000 average monthly users and has been downloaded by over 700,000 people. Over 1,000,000 projects have been written or recorded by songwriters. As of 2021, Tully offers a three-tiered pricing model and features available vary per plan.

Recognition
Tully has two patents to cover their proprietary songwriting technology, allowing users to play, write, and record in a single screen.

References

External links
 

Audio engineering
Android (operating system) software
Companies based in New York City
Companies based in San Francisco
IOS software
Mobile applications
Mobile music apps
Music software